The Zhangping–Quanzhou–Xiaocuo railway, also known as the Zhangquanxiao railway, is a regional railway in Fujian Province, China.  The line runs  eastward from Zhangping, in the interior, to Quanzhou, on the coast, and terminates at the Xiaocuo Harbor in the Port of Quanzhou.  Construction began in 1958 and the Zhangping-Quanzhou section entered operation in 2001. The extension to Xiaochuo Harbor was built in 2007.

The Zhangping–Quanzhou section of the rail line used to have fairly active passenger service, with a number of fairly slow trains connecting Quanzhou East railway station with major cities throughout China. Passenger service on this line was terminated, and Quanzhou East railway station closed on December 9, 2014, presumably as a consequence of the introduction of much faster high-speed service on the Fuzhou–Xiamen railway and connecting lines.

Rail connections
 Zhangping: Yingtan–Xiamen railway, Zhangping–Longchuan railway
 Quanzhou: Fuzhou–Xiamen railway

See also

 List of railways in China

References

Railway lines in China
Rail transport in Fujian
Railway lines opened in 2001